Charles Hudson Griffin (May 9, 1926 – September 10, 1989) was an American politician who served as a member of the United States House of Representatives from Mississippi's 3rd congressional district.

Early life and education 
Griffin was born on a farm near Utica, Mississippi. He attended Utica High School and Hinds Community College before graduating from Mississippi State University in 1949. Griffin was the great-great-grandson of Isaac Griffin, a Congressman from Pennsylvania.

He served in the United States Navy from 1944 to 1946 in Pacific War as a third class apprentice seaman and quartermaster.

Career 
Griffin served as assistant to United States Representative John Bell Williams from July 1, 1949, to January 15, 1968.

Griffin was elected as a Democrat to the Ninetieth Congress in a special election triggered by Williams' successful bid for governor of Mississippi.  He was reelected to the two succeeding Congresses (March 12, 1968 – January 3, 1973). He was not a candidate for reelection to the Ninety-third Congress in 1972. He then served as the Secretary of the Mississippi State senate from 1980 to 1989.

Personal life 
He was a resident of Utica, Mississippi, until his death there on September 10, 1989.

External links

1926 births
1989 deaths
United States Navy personnel of World War II
Democratic Party members of the United States House of Representatives from Mississippi
20th-century American politicians
People from Utica, Mississippi
Mississippi State University alumni
United States congressional aides